TTU K-12 is an  approved learning school from kindergarten through twelfth grade program in Texas, offering high school diplomas. It is operated by Texas Tech University, which is located in Lubbock. TTU K-12 offers individual courses (supplemental), credit by exams (CBEs), homeschool curriculum, bulk testing services, and a full-time Texas Diploma Program that includes high school, middle school and elementary school.

History 
TTU K-12 was established by legislative and state board action in 1993 as a "Special Purpose District" designed to educate students with special circumstances and whose educational needs were not adequately met by traditional schools. In 1998, the Commissioner of Education granted expansion of the program to include kindergarten through 8th grade. TTU K-12 now serves students in kindergarten through 12th grade.

Enrollment 
In 1994, the first graduating class from TTU K-12 consisted of only two students. Now, TTU K-12 has a total enrollment of around 1,500 full-time students among high school, middle school and elementary school students. TTU K-12 graduated more than 300 students in the class of 2017-2018 and had served more than 415,000 students in over 70 countries by the end of that academic year.

Students can enroll in courses through TTU K-12's full-time diploma-seeking program, where students take all the state-required courses and assessments to graduate. Upon graduation, students receive a Texas high school diploma.

Another option is the supplemental program. Students can catch up or get ahead by taking individual courses or credit by exams while still enrolled in their current school district.

Transfer credits 
All credits earned through TTU K-12 are recognized by colleges and universities.

Accreditation 
TTU K-12 is accredited by the Texas Education Agency (TEA). Courses and credit by exams (CBEs) are aligned with the Texas Essential Knowledge and Skills (TEKS). The high school courses are approved by the NCAA.

Notable students
TTU K-12 serves a variety of people including actors, singers, dancers, athletes, military families, families who travel often, non-traditional students, families living overseas, homeschool families, adults finishing high school, hospital/homebound students, students struggling in traditional school and anyone looking for an accredited school without attending a physical location.

Notable students include: 
 Ashley Cain – figure skater, TTU K-12 Class of 2015
 Mohana Krishnan – actor, plays Tammy Gilmore on Nickelodeon's I Am Frankie
 Sarah LeMaire – actor, plays Sarah Moody on the television show Wannabes
 Jordan Malone – Olympic speed skater 
 Hunter Parrish – actor
 Jesse Plemons – Emmy-nominated actor, played Landry Clarke on the television show Friday Night Lights and Robert Daly on the USS Callister episode of Black Mirror
 Leven Rambin – actor (All My Children, Terminator: The Sarah Connor Chronicles); was enrolled and scheduled to graduate in 2008
 Jeremy Shuler – 12-year-old who enrolled in Cornell University’s engineering school
 Jessica Simpson – singer and actor

See also

Texas Tech University

References

External links
TTU K-12
K-12 Highlights

School districts in Lubbock, Texas
Texas Tech University
School districts in Lubbock County, Texas